Mikitamäe Parish was a rural municipality of Estonia, in Põlva County. It had a population of 998 (as of 1 January 2009) and an area of 104.41 km².

Settlements
Villages
Audjassaare - Beresje - Igrise - Järvepää - Kahkva - Karisilla - Laossina - Lüübnitsa - Mikitamäe - Niitsiku - Puugnitsa - Rääsolaane - Rõsna - Selise - Toomasmäe - Usinitsa - Varesmäe - Võõpsu

People
Estonian stage actress and singer Olli Ungvere (1906-1991) was born in Mikitamäe Parish.

Gallery

References

External links